Geoff Frood (13 March 1906 – 8 March 1995) was a former Australian rules footballer who played with Melbourne in the Victorian Football League (VFL).

Notes

External links 

1906 births
1995 deaths
Australian rules footballers from Victoria (Australia)
Melbourne Football Club players
Caulfield Grammarians Football Club players